New York State Route 370 (NY 370) is an east–west state highway in Central New York in the United States. The western and central portions of the route pass through mostly rural areas; however, the eastern section serves densely populated areas of Onondaga County, including the villages of Baldwinsville and Liverpool. NY 370 also passes through Cayuga County, where it connects to NY 34, a major north–south highway in Central New York.

NY 370 was assigned as part of the 1930 renumbering of state highways in New York as a Red Creek–Liverpool highway, replacing NY 40 west of Cato and New York State Route 37 from Cato to Baldwinsville. From Liverpool to Syracuse, modern NY 370 was initially part of NY 57, a route that continued north from Liverpool to Oswego. That route was eliminated in 1982, at which time NY 370 was extended eastward to Syracuse over NY 57's former routing. Other minor changes, namely a series of realignments west of Victory, have also occurred in the years since NY 370 was assigned.

Route description

Maintenance of the route is also split in a similar fashion. West of Syracuse, the route is maintained by the New York State Department of Transportation (NYSDOT). Within Syracuse, the highway is city-maintained.

Red Creek to Baldwinsville
NY 370 begins at an intersection with NY 104 and NY 104A south of the village of Red Creek in the northeastern Wayne County town of Wolcott. The route heads southwest from this spot, utilizing a northeastward extension of Ridge Road that was part of US 104 prior to the construction of the super two highway now used by NY 104. After passing  of open farmland, the route breaks from Ridge Road and travels southeast through the Town of Butler and to the Cayuga County line. The rural surroundings follow NY 370 across the county line and into the town of Victory, where the highway briefly takes on a more easterly alignment as it intersects NY 38 in the town center. Here, it overtakes the east–west Conquest–Victory Town Line Road and heads eastward along the town line toward the village of Cato.

Just west of Cato village, NY 370 enters nearby Ira and the town of Cato. The route continues along the town line into the small village of Cato, where it becomes Main Street and meets NY 34 in the village center. At this point, NY 370 leaves the town line and heads northeast into Ira at the eastern village line. While in Ira, the highway leaves the village of Cato and passes by Cato–Meridian Central School, located in an otherwise nondescript area of the town dominated by farmland. At the school, the road curves back to the southeast to serve the village of Meridian and reenter the town of Cato. Here, the route reverts to a generally easterly alignment, one that it retains for the next  to Baldwinsville. East of Meridian, NY 370 crosses more cultivated fields as it intersects the south end of NY 176 and crosses into Onondaga County.

Across the county line, NY 370 enters the town of Lysander and becomes known as West Genesee Road. It runs across another  of rolling farmland before it begins to parallel the Erie Canal, here part of the Seneca River. At this point, the open fields gradually give way to pockets of residential development as the route approaches the village of Baldwinsville. West of the village limits, NY 370 connects to NY 31 and NY 690 at NY 690's continuation of Interstate 690's (I-690) northernmost grade-separated interchange. NY 31—which overlaps with NY 690 south of the junction—leaves the freeway and joins NY 370 for a  overlap that takes both routes along the north bank of the canal and into the densely populated village. They remain overlapped through Baldwinsville's central business district, where they meet NY 48 at Oswego Street.

Syracuse area

At the eastern edge of the village center, NY 31 and NY 370 split, with NY 31 retaining the Genesee Street name and heading northeast towards Oneida Lake. NY 370, meanwhile, travels southeast on Salina Street, loosely paralleling the Erie Canal as it heads toward Syracuse. The route intersects NY 631 before leaving Baldwinsville and heading into another rural section of Lysander. This open stretch ends at the canalside hamlet of Cold Springs, which serves as the beginning of the Syracuse suburbs. After passing through the community, NY 370 crosses over the conjoined Erie Canal and Seneca River and enters the town of Salina. Not far from the canal is a junction with John Glenn Boulevard, a four-lane arterial connecting NY 370 to Interstate 690 (I-690).

Past John Glenn Boulevard, NY 370 passes over the New York State Thruway (Interstate 90 or I-90) near exit 38 and begins to approach the northern shore of Onondaga Lake as it enters the village of Liverpool on 2nd Street. In the village's commercial center, NY 370 intersects Oswego Street, which connects to I-90, once part of NY 57 and now NY 931G, an unsigned reference route.

The parkway ends  from Liverpool at the eastern tip of the lake, where the route connects to I-81 at exit 24. NY 370 continues through the interchange, following the two-lane Park Street into the city of Syracuse. In its first few blocks in the city, the highway passes under the Mohawk Subdivision—CSX's main line across Central New York—and serves both NBT Bank Stadium and the Central New York Regional Market.

History

The portion of NY 370 east of Oswego Street in Liverpool was originally designated as part of Route 34, an unsigned legislative route, in 1908. When the first set of posted routes in New York were assigned in 1924, Route 34 became the basis for NY 20, a highway extending from Syracuse to Oswego via Liverpool and Fulton. NY 20 was renumbered to NY 57 in 1927 to eliminate duplication with the newly assigned US 20. To the west, the section of modern NY 370 from Upton Road west of the hamlet of Victory to NY 34 in Cato was designated as part of NY 40 in the mid-1920s. West of Victory, NY 40 followed Upton Road and Canada Street before terminating at NY 3 (now NY 104A) in Red Creek.

Although the portion of what is now NY 370 from Cato to Liverpool was state-maintained by 1926, it remained unnumbered until the late 1920s. At that time, the section west of then-NY 31 (now NY 48) in Baldwinsville became NY 37. The designation proved to be short-lived as it was renumbered to NY 370 as part of the 1930 renumbering of state highways in New York. At the same time, NY 40 was split into several different routes. From Cato to just east of Red Creek, old NY 40 became part of the new NY 370, which also extended southeastward to NY 57 in Liverpool. The small segment of former NY 40 from NY 3 to Upton Road was included in NY 3E (later US 104).

The portion of NY 370 west of Victory was realigned in the late 1950s to follow its modern alignment to a new terminus at US 104 (Ridge Road) southwest of Red Creek. After US 104 (now NY 104) was rerouted to follow a new super two highway through the Red Creek area in the early 1970s, the portion of Ridge Road between the super two east of Wolcott and NY 370 southwest of Red Creek became a westward extension of NY 370. The route was altered slightly at some point in the late 1970s or early 1980s to follow Ridge Road northeast to NY 104 instead.

In May 1982, the NY 57 designation was eliminated after the portion of the route north of Liverpool was removed from the state highway system. From Tulip Street to the Onondaga–Oswego county line, NY 57 was redesignated as County Route 91 (CR 91) but signed as CR 57. The portion of NY 57's former routing between NY 370 in Liverpool and US 11 in Syracuse became part of an extended NY 370. On September 11, 2010, a Megabus double-decker bus hit the low  railroad bridge along the Onondaga Lake Parkway killing four passengers. An overheight warning system was set up along the Parkway in late 2011 coinciding with the banning of commercial traffic along this stretch.

Major intersections

See also

References

External links

 Images of the construction of the Onondaga Lake Parkway from the Schuelke Collection of the Liverpool Public Library on New York Heritage Digital Collections

370
Transportation in Onondaga County, New York
Transportation in Cayuga County, New York
Transportation in Wayne County, New York
Transportation in Syracuse, New York